DJ Kicks: Vikter Duplaix is a DJ mix album, mixed by Vikter Duplaix. It was released on 28 January 2002 on the Studio !K7 independent record label as part of the DJ-Kicks series.

Track listing 
"The Beginning" - Critical Point - 3:22
"Together (Cry Tuff Original)" - Taurus - 1:56
"Hold It Down" - 4hero - 3:30
"The Crossing (Opaque Mix)" - P'taah - 2:46
"Feelin' Me Feelin' You" - Waiwan ft. Loretta Haywood - 4:06
"You Saw It All" - Herbert - 4:31
"Tree of Life" - Osunlade - 3:24
"Sensuality" - Vikter Duplaix - 6:08
"The Way" - Neppa Allstars - 3:19
"Happiness (Ashley Beedle's West Coast Mix)" - Shawn Lee - 2:53
"Berimbau (Bongo Re-Edit)" - Mandrake - 2:45
"Free as the Morning Sun" - Mr. Hermano - 4:34
"Welcome to the World" - Hopper ft. Carina Andersson - 5:43
"Transition" - Critical Point ft. Wadud - 1:08
"How Do I Move" - Spacek - 3:57
"Copa (Cabanga)" - De La Soul - 3:48
"Philadelphia" - Bahamadia - 2:46
"Bag Lady" - Erykah Badu - 3:23
"Holy Sounds" - Phillin Charles - 5:47
"The Sun" - New Sector Movements - 4:09

References

External links 
DJ-Kicks website

Duplaix, Vikter
2002 remix albums
2002 compilation albums